Bogumil can refer to:

 Bogomil (name), Slavic name also spelled Bogumil 
 Bogomilism, an ancient Gnostic religious community which is thought to have originated in Bulgaria